Kathleen Smet (born 19 January 1970, in Beveren) is an athlete from Belgium who competes in triathlon, becoming European champion in 2000 and 2002. She competes in Olympic and Long Distance Triathlons.

Smet competed at the first Olympic triathlon at the 2000 Summer Olympics.  She took sixteenth place with a total time of 2:04:05.98. Four years later, Smet again raced in the triathlon.  This time, she placed fourth with a total time of 2:05:39.89.

In 2005, she won the gold medal at the World Championships.

References
 Profile

1970 births
Living people
Belgian female triathletes
Olympic triathletes of Belgium
Triathletes at the 2000 Summer Olympics
Triathletes at the 2004 Summer Olympics
Sportspeople from East Flanders
People from Beveren